Turbinia  was the first steam turbine-powered steamship. Built as an experimental vessel in 1894, and easily the fastest ship in the world at that time, Turbinia was demonstrated dramatically at the Spithead Navy Review in 1897 and set the standard for the next generation of steamships, the majority of which would be turbine powered. The vessel is currently located at the Discovery Museum in Newcastle upon Tyne, North East England, while her original powerplant is located at the Science Museum in London.

Development
Charles Algernon Parsons invented the modern steam turbine in 1884, and having foreseen its potential to power ships, he set up the Parsons Marine Steam Turbine Company with five associates in 1893. To develop this, he had the experimental vessel Turbinia built in a light design of steel by the firm of Brown and Hood, based at Wallsend on Tyne in the North East of England.

The Admiralty was kept informed of developments, and Turbinia was launched on 2 August 1894. Despite the success of the turbine engine, initial trials with one propeller were disappointing. After discovering the problem of cavitation and constructing the first cavitation tunnel, Parsons' research led to his fitting three axial-flow turbines to three shafts, each shaft in turn driving three propellers, giving a total of nine propellers.

The turbines were directly driven, as geared turbines were not introduced until 1910. Even after the introduction of geared turbines, efficiency of even the largest axial steam turbines was still below 12% and Turbinia was even less efficient. Despite this, it was a dramatic improvement over predecessors.

Demonstration

Parsons' ship turned up unannounced at the Navy Review for the Diamond Jubilee of Queen Victoria at Spithead, on 26 June 1897, in front of the Prince of Wales, foreign dignitaries, and Lords of the Admiralty. As an audacious publicity stunt, Turbinia, which was much faster than any other ship at the time, raced between the two lines of navy ships and steamed up and down in front of the crowd and princes, while easily evading a navy picket boat that tried to pursue her, almost swamping it with her wake.

Photographer and cinematographer Alfred J. West took several photographs of Turbinia travelling at full speed at the review. He was subsequently invited by Sir Charles Parsons to film and photograph the vessel within the River Tyne and the adjacent North Sea; the pictures captured remain the defining image of Turbinia at speed.

Both vessels were lost to accidents in 1901, but although their losses slowed the introduction of turbines, the Admiralty had been convinced. In 1900, Turbinia steamed to Paris and was shown to French officials, and then displayed at the Paris Exhibition.

The first turbine-powered merchant vessel, the Clyde steamer , followed in 1901. The Admiralty confirmed in 1905 that all future Royal Navy vessels were to be turbine-powered, and in 1906, the first turbine-powered battleship, the revolutionary , was launched.

Crosby incident
On 11 January 1907, Turbinia was struck and nearly cut in two by Crosby – a ship being launched across-river from the south bank of the Tyne. She was repaired and steamed alongside  (also a turbine-powered vessel) after the launch of the great ocean liner. However, mechanical problems prevented Turbinia from accompanying Mauretania down the River Tyne to the sea.

As a museum ship

The company decided to slow down the deterioration of Turbinia by lifting her out of the water in 1908, and in 1926, the directors of the Parsons Marine Steam Turbine Company offered the ship to the Science Museum, London. Turbinia was cut in two and the aft section, complete with engines and propellers, was put on display in the South Kensington museum in London, which did not have the space to accommodate the full ship. The fore section was presented in 1944 to Newcastle Corporation, and placed on display in the city's Exhibition Park. In 1959, the Science Museum took the aft section of Turbinia off display, and by 1961, using a reconstructed centre section, Turbinia was once more complete and on display in the Newcastle Municipal Museum of Science and Industry. In 1983, a complete reconstruction was undertaken.

On 30 October 1994, 100 years after her launch, Turbinia was moved to Newcastle's Museum of Science and Engineering (later renamed the Discovery Museum) and put on display to the public in March 1996. Listed as part of the National Historic Fleet, in 2000, the vessel was the focal point of a year-long, £10.7 million redevelopment programme at the Discovery Museum. The gallery around Turbinia was the first area to be refurbished, with the main part of the work involving raising the roof by one storey to create viewing galleries on three levels.

Notes

References

Bibliography

External links

 Turbinia profile
 Profile of Charles Parsons
 Article from Institute of Marine Engineers "Bulletin"
 Tyne And Wear Museum Service booklet on Turbinia from 1981
 Photo of Turbinia after colliding with the Crosby
 Turbinia at the Newcastle Discovery Museum 
 Turbinia profiled in "A History of the North East in 100 objects"
 Turbinia at speed – but who’s on the conning tower?", a detailed Museum originated blog entry by Ian Whitehead, the Tyne & Wear Archives & Museums curator charged with Turbina's care in 2013.

1894 ships
Museums in Newcastle upon Tyne
Museum ships in the United Kingdom
Ships and vessels of the National Historic Fleet
Ships preserved in museums
Steam turbine-powered ships
Water speed records
Historic Mechanical Engineering Landmarks
Maritime incidents in 1907